Emory Point is a mixed-use development on Clifton Road in Druid Hills, unincorporated DeKalb County, Georgia, adjacent to Atlanta. It is across Clifton Road from the Centers for Disease Control and surrounded on three sides by the campus of Emory University. 

The complex is located on "The Cliff" Emory University shuttle line.

The complex contains  of retail space and 443 apartments. The total cost of development was variously quoted as USD 60 million to USD 250 million.

History
The project was originally planned in 2006 as a  condominium complex only. It was stopped in 2008 as the Great Recession deepened but was finally completed in 2012.

Construction began in 2012 with the demolition of the Emory Inn, a hotel on the site.

At its opening in Fall 2012, Emory Point was the first new retail project built in the area in 20 years, the largest private development start inside the Perimeter in three years, and the first partnership between Cousins Properties (75%) and Gables Residential (25%), two Atlanta-based development companies.

Tenants included CVS Pharmacy, JoS. A. Bank Clothiers, and Ann Taylor Loft, Bonefish Grill, Fresh to Order, Which Wich? as well as other chain and independent stores and restaurants. As of December 2012, twenty-one shops and restaurants were either open or lined up to open by February 2013.

Gallery

References

External links

Official website

Mixed-use developments in Georgia (U.S. state)
Emory University
Druid Hills, Georgia